Lada Vladimirovna Jienbalanova (born April 10, 1970) is a female modern pentathlete from Kazakhstan. She competed at the 2004 Summer Olympics in Athens, Greece, where she finished fourteenth in the women's event with a score of 5,076 points. At the 2008 Summer Olympics, Jienbalanova fell off her horse during the riding segment, and decided not to run in the 3 km-cross country race, finishing only in last place.

In 2002, Jienbalanova achieved her best results in the modern pentathlon by winning gold medals at the Asian Championships in Tokyo, Japan, and at the Asian Games in Busan, South Korea. She also led her national team to obtain the bronze medal at the 2010 Asian Games in Guangzhou, China.

References

External links
  (archived page at Pentathlon.org)

1970 births
Living people
Kazakhstani female modern pentathletes
Olympic modern pentathletes of Kazakhstan
Modern pentathletes at the 2004 Summer Olympics
Modern pentathletes at the 2008 Summer Olympics
Asian Games medalists in modern pentathlon
Modern pentathletes at the 2002 Asian Games
Modern pentathletes at the 2010 Asian Games
Asian Games gold medalists for Kazakhstan
Asian Games bronze medalists for Kazakhstan
Medalists at the 2002 Asian Games
Medalists at the 2010 Asian Games
21st-century Kazakhstani women